Chun Jung-myung (born November 29, 1980) is a South Korean actor. Chun made his break into the entertainment industry in the KBS teen drama School 2 (1999). He is best known for his leading roles in TV dramas such as Fashion 70's (2005), Goodbye Solo (2006), What's Up Fox? (2006), Cinderella's Sister (2010), The Duo, Glory Jane (2011), Reset (2014), Heart to Heart (2015), and Master - God of Noodles (2016).

He also starred in the films The Aggressives (2005), Les Formidables (2006), Hansel and Gretel (2007), and Queen of the Night (2013).

Chun started his own management company in 2011. Since the early 2010's, Chun has trained Brazilian Jiu Jitsu and is a purple belt under John Frankl. In his Instagram post last June 2022, the actor shared that he have attained the black belt in Jiu Jitsu after 11 years of hardwork.

Filmography

Television series

Film

Variety show

Music video

Awards and nominations

References

External links 

Chun Jung-myung Fan Cafe at Daum 

Male actors from Seoul
South Korean male film actors
South Korean male television actors
1980 births
Living people
Sangji University alumni
21st-century South Korean male actors
Yeongyang Cheon clan
Best New Actor Paeksang Arts Award (television) winners